El Abiodh Sidi Cheikh (Arabic: الأبيض سيدي الشيخ, is a municipality in El Bayadh Province, Algeria. It is the district seat of El Abiodh Sidi Cheikh District and has a population of 24.949 (2008), which gives it 7 seats in the PMA. Its postal code is 32300 and its municipal code is 3207.

The town is the base of the Awlad Sidi Shaykh confederation of tribes.

References

Communes of El Bayadh Province
El Bayadh Province